Popstar to Operastar was a British television music competition to find new singing talent in Opera. The show began on 15 January 2010 and finished on 19 February 2010. The show has eight popstars which took part within the competition battled each other learning opera. The judges were Rolando Villazón, Katherine Jenkins, Meat Loaf and Laurence Llewelyn-Bowen. The winner of the show was Darius Campbell and with the runner-up being Bernie Nolan.

Popstars

Results summary

Colour key:

Episodes 

Voting percentages are from ITV.com.

 Most Public Votes
 Eliminated
 Bottom two

Week 1 

Performances

Bottom two
 Alex James - Eliminated on judges tied, lowest viewer votes
 Vanessa White

Voting Results
Rolando Villazón and Katherine Jenkins saved Vanessa. Meat Loaf and Laurence Llewelyn-Bowen saved Alex.

Guest Performers
 Camilla Kerslake sang "How Can I Keep from Singing?" accompanied by Gary Barlow on piano.

Week 2 

Performances

Bottom two
 Vanessa White - Eliminated on judges tied, lowest viewer votes
 Jimmy Osmond

Guest Performer
 Katherine Jenkins sang "Chanson Bohème" from Carmen.

Week 3 

Performances

Bottom two
 Jimmy Osmond - Eliminated by judges
 Danny Jones

Voting Results
Three judges voted to save Danny Jones. Since a majority of votes were cast one way Katherine Jenkins did not vote, but stated that she also would have voted for Jones to stay.

Guest Performer
 Rolando Villazón sang Tosti's "L'alba separa dalla luce l'ombra".

Week 4 

Performances

Bottom two
 Danny Jones - Eliminated by public votes after judges were dead-locked
 Marcella Detroit

Voting Results
Meat Loaf and Katherine Jenkins saved Marcella Detroit. Rolando Villazón and Laurence Llewelyn-Bowen saved Danny Jones.

Guests Performers
 Mika and Danielle de Niese sang "Rain".

Week 5 (Semi Final) 

Performances

Bottom two
 Kym Marsh - Eliminated
 Marcella Detroit - 3rd Place

Both Eliminated by public votes

Guest Performers
 Meat Loaf and Juliette Pochin sang "Bat Out of Hell".

Week 6 (Final) 

Performances

Final Result

Darius Campbell was declared the winner with 50.1% of the public votes and closed the show with a rendition of Non piú andrai.

Ratings 
Episode Viewing figures from Broadcasters' Audience Research Board (BARB).

References

2010 in British television
2010 in British music
2010 British television seasons
Popstar to Operastar